Deborah Ann Soholt (born January 29, 1956) is an American politician and a Republican member of the South Dakota Senate representing District 14 since January 8, 2013.

Education
Soholt earned her BSN from University of North Dakota and her MSN from South Dakota State University.

Elections
2012 When incumbent Senate District 14 Republican Senator Joni Cutler left the Legislature and left the seat open, Soholt won the June 5, 2012 Republican Primary with 896 votes (54.2%) and won the November 6, 2012 General election with 6,251 votes (55.5%) against Democratic nominee Brian Kaatz.

References

External links
Official page at the South Dakota Legislature
Campaign site
 

Place of birth missing (living people)
Living people
Politicians from Sioux Falls, South Dakota
Republican Party South Dakota state senators
South Dakota State University alumni
University of North Dakota alumni
Women state legislators in South Dakota
1956 births
21st-century American politicians
21st-century American women politicians